Hopewell Township may refer to:

Arkansas
Hopewell Township, Greene County, Arkansas, in Greene County, Arkansas

Illinois
Hopewell Township, Marshall County, Illinois

New Jersey
Hopewell Township, Cumberland County, New Jersey
Hopewell Township, Mercer County, New Jersey

Ohio
Hopewell Township, Licking County, Ohio
Hopewell Township, Mercer County, Ohio
Hopewell Township, Muskingum County, Ohio
Hopewell Township, Perry County, Ohio
Hopewell Township, Seneca County, Ohio

Pennsylvania
Hopewell Township, Beaver County, Pennsylvania
Hopewell Township, Bedford County, Pennsylvania
Hopewell Township, Cumberland County, Pennsylvania
Hopewell Township, Huntingdon County, Pennsylvania
Hopewell Township, Washington County, Pennsylvania
Hopewell Township, York County, Pennsylvania

Township name disambiguation pages